Sal Sparace is a technical Director for BSKYB. British Sky Broadcasting is the operator of the United Kingdom's largest digital television platform and a leading broadcaster of sports, movies, entertainment and news.

Sparace,  was born in Italy in 1965 and he moved to London in 1988 working for the first  Italian satellite international news bulletin. The programme produced by RAI chief correspondent Sandro Paternostro was broadcast daily from Visnews. Reuters, the world's largest news agency bought control of Visnews in 1992. In 1993 Visnews changed its name to Reuters Television. (Reuters is a global information company providing information tailored for professionals in the financial services, media and corporate markets.)

Sal Sparace was the technical manager for several TV shows in the United Kingdom including a soap called Family Affairs which was the first programme aired by Channel Five in 1997. In 2002 he was the technical director for Channel 4 breakfast show RI:SE which replaced The Big Breakfast. The programme produced by BSKYB and Princess Productions, featured celebrity interviews, newspaper reviews, entertainment news and outside broadcasts.
As part of Sky's '[The Bigger Picture]' project, Andrew Haynes from Technology Platforms and Sal Sparace (Broadcast Operations) set up a group that worked with a local charity, Creative Grammar together with students from Ravensbourne College, to create a programme called The Magic Word show.
The initiative is intended to help small children understand words and grammar through the use of characters, games and stories.

External links
RAI
Princess Productions

British television personalities
Living people
Year of birth missing (living people)